Chittagong Colony is one of the neighbourhoods of S.I.T.E. Town in Karachi, Sindh, Pakistan. Chittagong Colony is a neighbourhood whose population consists mostly of ethnic Chittagonian and Bengalis. When one walks through the colony, one can see the colourful Bengali signboards, Bhashani caps, lungis and kurtas. The Chittagong Colony has a baazaar, which was famous throughout Pakistan as the centre for Dhaka and Chittagong cloth. It was also the headquarters of the local Bengali language newspaper, Daily Qaumi Bandhan.

See also
 Bengalis in Pakistan

References

External links
 Karachi Website.
 Local Government Sindh.

Neighbourhoods of Karachi
Ethnic enclaves in Pakistan
Bengali-speaking countries and territories